Al Rasheed Street or Al Rashid Street (Arabic:  شارع الرشيد) is one of the main streets in downtown Baghdad.

Its origin dates back to the Ottomans who ruled Iraq from 1534 to 1918. During that time, the only known public street in Baghdad was Al Naher Street (Shari al-Naher). Al Naher means river - the street stretches a few kilometers along the east banks of the river Tigris, so this may be the reasoning behind its name.

The British were defeated by the Ottomans on April 29, 1916, in Kut (south of Baghdad), where tens of thousands of Anglo-Indian troops died or were wounded, and thousands more were taken prisoner, including their commander Sir Charles Townshend. The military governor of Baghdad, Khalil Pasha (1864–1923), decided to honor this victory by giving orders to build the first ever "real" street in Baghdad. Work began in May 1916, after the head of Baghdad's municipality, Ra'ouf Al Chadirchy, met with local landlords to pay them compensations for the demolition of their property.

The street was first opened for the public on July 23, 1916. The first name given to the street was by Khalil Pasha who named the street "Jadde Si". The name of the street was then inscribed on a ceramic plate and placed on the main wall of Sultan Ali Mosque. The sign lasted until the mid-1950s.

In 1917, Al Rasheed Street was the first street to be electrically illuminated in Baghdad city.

References

Rasheed
Rasheed